Sugar Queen (2006) is a studio album by Northern Irish singer-songwriter Brian Houston.

Track listing 
 "End of the Beginning" (4:19)
 "Childish Things" (4:06)
 "A Woman's Touch" (3:15)
 "Sugar Queen" (4:21)
 "These Days" (4:07)
 "The Ballad of Matthew Shepard" (3:43)
 "Chase the Devil" (2:57)
 "Someday" (3:31)
 "Out of the Ruins" (4:08)
 "Red Badge of Courage" (5:41)
 "It's A New Year Baby (Live)" (4:48)
 "Good News Junkie" (3:31)

References

2006 albums
Brian Houston (musician) albums